The events of 1999 in anime.

Accolades  
At the Mainichi Film Awards, Jin-Roh: The Wolf Brigade won the Animation Film Award and The Old Man and the Sea won the Ōfuji Noburō Award. Internationally, The Old Man and the Sea also won the Academy Award for Best Animated Short Film.

Releases

See also
1999 in Japanese television
1999 in Italian television
1999 in Portuguese television
1999 in Macau
1999 in Spain
1999 in animation
1999 in television

References

External links 
Japanese animated works of the year, listed in the IMDb

Anime
Anime
Years in anime